Yolanda Wisher (born 1976) is an American poet, educator and spoken word artist who focuses on the experience of being African-American. She is a graduate of Temple University and was selected as the third Poet Laureate of Philadelphia in 2016.

Education and early life

Yolanda Wisher was born in Philadelphia and grew up in North Wales, Pennsylvania.  She studied English and Black Studies, obtaining her BA in English and Black Studies from Lafayette College. She received her MA in creative writing from Temple University in 2000.

Career

Wisher taught English for various years at the Germantown Friends School. She was the founder and director of the Germantown Poetry Festival, a local poetry event in the Germantown neighborhood of Philadelphia from 2006 to 2010. From 2010 to 2015, she served as the Director of Art Education for the City of Philadelphia Mural Arts Program.

As of 2015, Wisher is a Founding Cultural Agent for the U.S. Department of Arts and Culture. In 2016, she was chosen as the third poet laureate of Philadelphia, following Sonia Sanchez (2012–13) and Frank Sherlock (2014–15), respectively, and is a 2016 writer-in-residence at the Hedgebrook residency program for women writers.

Personal life

Wisher lives in Germantown with her partner Mark Palacio and their son Thelonius. She frequently plays music with her band "Yolanda Wisher and the Quick Fixx".

Works by Wisher
Books of Poetry
 2014: Monk Eats an Afro, OCLC 8795289
Contributor to Anthologies
2007: The Ringing Ear: Black Poets Lean South,  OCLC 239032215
2009: A Best of Fence: The First Nine Years, OCLC 318878255
2013: Gathering Ground: a Reader Celebrating Cave Canem's First Decade, OCLC 62133808
2013: Peace is a Haiku Song (ed. with Sonia Sanchez), OCLC 877155740
Wisher has also published in periodicals including American Poetry Review, Black Arts Quarterly, Chain, Drumvoices Revue, Fence, Hanging Loose, Melus, Meridians Feminism, Race, Transnationalism, nocturnes (re)view of the literary arts, Open Letter, Ploughshares, and POeP!.

Awards and honors

Wisher was chosen as the poet laureate of Montgomery County, Pennsylvania, in 1999 and later selected as the third poet laureate of Philadelphia in 2016, by mayor-elect Jim Kenney.

She was a fellow of the Cave Canem Foundation from 1999 to 2000 and has published in their anthology Gathering Ground (2013).

She received a Leeway Art and Change grant in 2008. and was the recipient of a Pew Center for Arts and Heritage grant for 2015.

References

External links

 
 US Department of Arts and Culture – Imagining Germantown (2014)
 Philadelphia Mural Arts Program

African-American poets
Lafayette College alumni
Temple University alumni
Writers from Philadelphia
1976 births
Living people
Pew Fellows in the Arts
American women poets
American spoken word artists
Municipal Poets Laureate in the United States
Poets Laureate of Philadelphia
21st-century African-American people
21st-century African-American women
20th-century African-American people
20th-century African-American women
African-American women writers